Howard Terbell McNear (January 27, 1905 – January 3, 1969) was an American stage, screen, and radio character actor. McNear is best remembered as the original voice of Doc Adams in the radio version of Gunsmoke and as Floyd Lawson (Floyd the Barber) on The Andy Griffith Show (1961–1967).

Career
McNear studied at the Oatman School of Theater and later joined a stock company in San Diego. McNear also worked in radio from the late 1930s, including in the 1937–1940 radio serial Speed Gibson of the International Secret Police as ace operator Clint Barlow.<ref>[http://www.audio-classics.com/lspeedgibson.html Radio Broadcast Log Of: Speed Gibson of the International Secret Police]</ref> McNear could be effective in such authoritative roles, but he gravitated more toward character roles, often comic. 

He enlisted as a private in the United States Army Air Corps on November 17, 1942, during World War II.

He created the role of Doc Charles Adams in CBS Radio's Gunsmoke (1952–1961). McNear was under contract to CBS for many years and was featured in many of the network's radio and TV programs. From 1955 to 1960 he appeared frequently, in various roles, in the popular radio detective series Yours Truly, Johnny Dollar. McNear made his film debut in an uncredited role in the 1953 film Escape from Fort Bravo.

In 1956, he appeared in the episode “The Pest Hole” (S1E24) in the TV Western Gunsmoke. In a 1958 episode of Leave it to Beaver, McNear made a TV appearance as a barber named "Andy", who gave Wally his first shave. Over the course of his career, he would appear in over one hundred film and television guest spots. In 1959, McNear portrayed Dr. Dompierre in the film Anatomy of a Murder, who testified about collecting evidence of a rape.
In a 1960 episode of Peter Gunn, titled "A Slight Touch of Homicide", McNear used the mannerisms he later developed as Floyd the barber to play Barnaby, a vigilante  chemist who killed 15 mobsters with explosives.

In 1961, McNear was cast as the vague, chatty barber Floyd Lawson on The Andy Griffith Show. In 1963, he suffered a stroke that rendered most of the left side of his body paralyzed. He left the series for nearly a year and a half to recover. Andy Griffith asked McNear to return to the series. McNear agreed despite being unable to walk or stand, and the production crew accommodated him accordingly. Floyd was subsequently seen onscreen either seated or standing with support. Many scenes were shot with him sitting on a bench outside the barber shop, as opposed to trimming hair as before. In most of his post-stroke scenes, McNear's left hand would be holding a newspaper or resting in his lap, while he moved his right arm and hand as he spoke his lines. In a 1964 episode, "Otis Sues the County", and a 1967 episode, "Goober's Contest", McNear's character is heard, but not seen, walking into the courthouse. The next scene shows Floyd already seated in a chair. According to Jack Dodson, who played Howard Sprague on The Andy Griffith Show, McNear began having difficulty remembering his lines and became anxious and frustrated. He left the series in 1967.

In 1962 he made a guest appearance on The Twilight Zone in the episode "Hocus Pocus and Frisby". In 1964, McNear also took a role on Gunsmoke'', playing Dodge City's general store owner in “Aunt Thede” (S10E13).

Death
On January 3, 1969, McNear died at San Fernando Valley Veterans Hospital in California at the age of 63 as a result of complications from pneumonia caused by a stroke.

Filmography

Footnotes

External links

1905 births
1969 deaths
20th-century American male actors
Actors with disabilities
American male film actors
American male radio actors
American male stage actors
American male television actors
American male voice actors
Deaths from pneumonia in California
Male Western (genre) film actors
Male actors from Los Angeles
Military personnel from California
United States Army Air Forces personnel of World War II
United States Army Air Forces soldiers